Fedir Laukhin (born 13 February 1974) is a Ukrainian athlete. He competed in the men's decathlon at the 2000 Summer Olympics.

References

1974 births
Living people
Athletes (track and field) at the 2000 Summer Olympics
Ukrainian decathletes
Olympic athletes of Ukraine
Place of birth missing (living people)